Dru Mamo Kanuha is an American politician currently serving in the Hawaii Senate from Hawaii's 3rd district. He was elected to the seat after incumbent Democrat Josh Green ran for Lieutenant Governor of Hawaii. He defeated Libertarian candidate Michael Last in the general election, winning 79.3% to 20.7%.

References

21st-century American politicians
Democratic Party Hawaii state senators
Living people
Year of birth missing (living people)